Iru or IRU may refer to:

IRU
 Incident Response Unit – a team responding to (for example) a major fire's knock-on effect on surrounding infrastructure (roads, railways, homes)
International Road Transport Union (IRU)
International Romani Union, an organization of the Romani people
Inertial Reference Unit, a sensor for aircraft and spacecraft
Indefeasible rights of use, a long-term lease of bandwidth
Innovative Research Universities, network of seven Australian universities
Irish Rugby Union short for Irish Rugby Football Union

Iru
Iru Khechanovi (born 2000), a Georgian singer and songwriter
Iru (food), type of fermented locust beans used as a condiment in cooking
Iru (brachiopod), genus of brachiopod
Iru, alternative rominziation of Il, a character from the manga series Shugo Chara! by Peach-Pit
Iru village, village in Jõelähtme Parish, Harju County, Estonia
Iru, Tallinn, subdistrict of Tallinn, Estonia